Menidia is a genus of Neotropical silversides native to freshwater, brackish and marine habitats along the Atlantic and Gulf of Mexico coasts of North America, ranging from the Gulf of Saint Lawrence in Canada to the Yucatán Peninsula in Mexico. The species M. clarkhubbsi, an all-female species, reproduces asexually.

Species
There are currently eight recognized species in this genus:
 Menidia audens Hay, 1882 (Mississippi silverside)
 Menidia beryllina (Cope, 1867) (Inland silverside)
 Menidia clarkhubbsi A. A. Echelle & Mosier, 1982 (Texas silverside)
 Menidia colei C. L. Hubbs, 1936 (Golden silverside)
 Menidia conchorum Hildebrand & Ginsburg, 1927 (Key silverside)
 Menidia extensa C. L. Hubbs & Raney, 1946 (Waccamaw silverside)
 Menidia menidia (Linnaeus, 1766) (Atlantic silverside)
 Menidia peninsulae (Goode & T. H. Bean, 1879) (Tidewater silverside)

References

 
 Echelle, Anthony A. and Doyle T. Mosier, "Menidia clarkhubbsi, n. sp. (Pisces: Atherinidae), an All-Female Species." Copeia, Vol. 1982, No. 3 (Aug. 10, 1982), pp. 533–540

 
Extant Pliocene first appearances
Ray-finned fish genera
Taxa named by Charles Lucien Bonaparte